Angels of Death may refer to:

 Angels of Death (Hawkwind album), 1986
 Angels of Death (Jennifer Castle album), 2018
 Angels of Death (Representativz album), 1999
 Angels of Death (video game), a Japanese horror adventure game
 Lainz Angels of Death, four Austrian nurses who confessed to 49 murders between 1983 and 1989
 Engelen des doods or Angels of Death, a 1998 documentary by Leo de Boer
 The Angels of Death MC,  a fictional biker gang in Grand Theft Auto IV: The Lost and Damned

See also
 Angel of Death (disambiguation)
 Death angel (disambiguation)